The Scotland national rugby league team represents the nation of Scotland in international rugby league. It is administered by Scotland Rugby League, the governing body of rugby league in Scotland, and competes as a member of the Rugby League European Federation (RLEF), which encompasses the countries of Europe. The team played its first match on 13 August 1995 against Ireland and was given full international status in 1996. Since its first competitive match, more than 150 players have made at least one international appearance for the team.

Notable Scottish players

Scotland's Great Britain Rugby League Internationals
 Roy Kinnear, for Great Britain (RL): 1-cap, for Great Britain (RU): ?-caps, for Scotland (RU) while at Heriot's Rugby Club (RU) 1926 3-caps, for Other Nationalities: 3-caps (signed for Wigan 1926–27)
 Alan Tait, for Great Britain (RL): 16-caps, for Great Britain (RU): 2-caps, for Scotland (RU) while at Kelso RFC?  (RU) 27-caps, for Scotland (RL): 4-caps (signed for Widnes 1988)
 Andrew Hogg, for Great Britain (England/Northern Union aka RFL) (RL) while at Broughton ?-caps, for Other Nationalities while at Broughton ?-caps
 David Rose, for Great Britain (RL): ?-caps, for Scotland (RU) while at Jed-Forest RFC (RU) 1951–53 7-caps (signed for Leeds 1953–54)
 Dave Valentine (Rob Valentine's older brother) (Testimonial match 1956), for Great Britain (RL) while at Huddersfield 15-caps (World Cup 1954 Captain 4-caps), for Scotland (RU) while at Hawick RFC (RU) 1947 2-caps, for Other Nationalities while at Huddersfield circa-1951 16-caps (signed for Huddersfield 1947–48)
 George 'Happy' Wilson for Great Britain (RL) while at Workington 1951 New Zealand ?-caps, for Scotland (RU) while at Team? 1947 3-caps, for Other Nationalities: ?-caps (signed for Workington date?)
 George Fairbairn, for Great Britain (RL) while at Wigan 1977 France, New Zealand, Australia x 2; 1978 Australia x 3; 1979 Australia x 2, New Zealand x 3; 1980 New Zealand x 2; Hull Kingston Rovers. 1981 France; 1982 Australia x 2, for England (RL) while at Wigan 1975 Wales x 2, New Zealand x 2, Australia x 2, France, Papua New Guinea; 1977 Wales, France ; 1978 France; 1980 Wales, France; 1981 France, Wales; Hull Kingston Rovers. Wales
 Hugh Waddell, for Great Britain (RL) while at Oldham 1988 France x 2, Australia, New Zealand; Leeds 1989 France, for Scotland (RL): ?-caps, for England (RL) while at Blackpool 1984 Wales
 Billy McGinty, for Great Britain (RL): ?-caps, for Scotland Nines (RL): ?-caps
 Dale Laughton, for Great Britain (RL): ?-caps, for Scotland (RL): ?-caps
 Rob Valentine (Dave Valentine's younger brother), for Great Britain (RL) while at Huddersfield 1967 Australia 1-cap, for South of Scotland (RU) while at Hawick RFC (RU) 1963 3-caps, for Other Nationalities while at Keighley 1975 Lancashire (1 or 2)-caps (signed for Huddersfield 11/1963)
 Andrew "Drew" Turnbull, for Great Britain (RL): 1-cap
 Charles "Charlie" Renilson, for Great Britain (RL): 8-caps
 Lee Gilmour, for Great Britain (RL): ?-caps, for Scotland (RL): ?-caps
 Richard Horne, for Great Britain (RL): ?-caps, for Scotland (RL): ?-caps

Roy Kinnear, David Rose, Alan Tait, Dave Valentine, and George Wilson; all played for both Great Britain (RL) and Scotland (RU).

Scotland (RU) Internationals who moved to Rugby league
 Alex Laidlaw, for Scotland (RU) while at Hawick RFC (RU) 1897 1-cap (signed for Bradford 1898–99)
 Anthony Little, for Scotland (RU) while at Hawick RFC (RU) 1905 1-cap (signed for Wigan 1905–06)
 George Douglas, for Scotland (RU) while at Jed-Forest RFC (RU) 1921 1-cap (signed for Batley 1921–22)
 Roy Kinnear, for Scotland (RU) while at Heriot's Rugby Club (RU) 1926 3-caps (signed for Wigan 1926–27)
 William Welsh, for Scotland (RU) while at Hawick RFC (RU) 1927–33 21-cap (signed for London Highfield 1933–34)
 Gordon Cottington, for Scotland (RU) while at Kelso RFC (RU) 1934–36 5-caps (signed Castleford 1936–37)
 Gordon Gray, for Scotland (RU) while at Gala RFC (RU) 1935–37 4-caps (signed for Huddersfield 1937–38)
 Dave Valentine, for Scotland (RU) while at Hawick RFC (RU) 1947 2-caps (signed for Huddersfield 1947–48)
 Thomas Wright, for Scotland (RU) while at Hawick RFC (RU) 1947 1-cap (signed for Leeds 1948–49)
 David Rose, for Scotland (RU) while at Jed-Forest RFC (RU) 1951–53 7-caps (signed for Huddersfield 1953–54)
 Hugh Duffy for Scotland (RU) while at Jed-Forest RFC (RU) 1955 1-cap (signed for Salford 1954–55)
 Brian Shillinglaw, for Scotland (RU) while at Gala RFC (RU) 1960–61 5-caps (signed for Whitehaven 1961–62)
 Ronald "Ron" Cowan, for Scotland (RU) while at Selkirk RFC (RU) 1961–62 5-caps (signed for Leeds 1962–63)
 Alan Tait, for Scotland (RU) while at Kelso RFC?  (RU) 27-caps (signed for Widnes 1988)
 Jon Steel, for Scotland (RU) while at Border Reivers (RU) ?-caps

South of Scotland District (RU) players who moved to Rugby league
 George 'Happy' Wilson, for South of Scotland District (RU) while at Team? 1947 3-caps (signed for Workington date?)
 Rob Valentine, for South of Scotland District (RU) while at Hawick RFC (RU) 1953 3-caps (signed for Huddersfield 11/1963)

Scotland (RL) Internationals who went on to play for Scotland (RU)
 Andy Craig
 George Graham
 James "Jim" McLaren
 Gareth Morton

Players
Statistics correct as of 8 January 2021

See also
 List of Great Britain national rugby league team players
 Scotland national rugby league team match results
 Scotland A national rugby league team

References

 Scotland
 
Scotland